Sunshine in the Rain – The Album is BWO's special compilation album for Japan and was released on April 15, 2009. It contains 15 songs and 3 remixes. The first single of this album is "Sunshine in the Rain" and the second single is "Lay Your Love on Me".

Track listing 

"Sunshine in the Rain" – 3:30
"Lay Your Love on Me" – 2:59
"Chariots of Fire" – 4:10
"Temple of Love" – 3:25
"Gone" – 3:01
"Voodoo Magic" – 3:42
"Sixteen Tons of Hardware" – 3:30
"Will My Arms Be Strong Enough" – 4:16
"Conquering America" – 3:21
"We Could Be Heroes" – 4:23
"Save My Pride" – 4:00
"Gomenasai" – 3:29
"Open Door" – 3:30
"Give Me the Night" – 3:10
"The Bells of Freedom" – 3:29
"Sunshine in the Rain (Daishi Dance Remix)" – 7:22
"Chariots of Fire (Housemason Remix)" – 6:28
"Sunshine in the Rain (House Nation Remix)" – 7:31

BWO (band) albums
2009 compilation albums